Herbert Addo (24 June 1951 – 24 March 2017) was a Ghanaian Premier League football coach. He was born in Accra. He coached Hasaacas, Asante Kotoko, Ashanti Gold, Hearts of Oak, Aduana Stars and Inter Allies. He also coached Gabonese club Shellsport now Mbilinga.

Honours 
Hasaacas

 WAFU Cup: 1981–82, runners-up: 1982–83

 SWAG Cup: 1982–83, 1983–84

Kumasi Cornerstone

 WAFU Club Championship: 1987

Shellsport

 Coupe du Gabon Interclubs: 1989–90
Ashanti Gold

 Ghana Premier League: 1994–95, 1995–96
 SWAG Cup: 1994, 1995

 CAF Champions League runners-up: 1997

Aduana Stars

 Ghana Premier League: 2010

Accra Hearts of Oak

 Ghana Premier League: 2002
 President's Cup: 2003, 2015
Inter Allies

 Ghanaian FA Cup runners-up: 2014

Ghana

 West African Nations Cup [SCSA Zone III]: 1983, 1986, 1987
Ghana A'
 WAFU Nations Cup third place: 2010

References 

1951 births
2017 deaths
Ghanaian football managers
Aduana Stars F.C. managers
Accra Hearts of Oak S.C. managers
Sekondi Hasaacas F.C. managers
Asante Kotoko S.C. managers
Ashanti Gold S.C. managers
Ghana Premier League managers